Boniface Doe (born 14 January 1957) is a Liberian professional football coach and former player who is the current Technical Director of the South African football club Eastern Cape Bees F.C.

Boniface is the most successful Liberian coach. He led the  Nigerian Premier League club Shooting Stars to the  1996 African Cup of Champions Clubs Final. He was one of the five coaches who were short listed for the Liberian National Team coaching job.

Achievements 

2004	Helped Bloemfontein Cletics, Promoted to Premier League

2000	Led Max Bees (Ghana) From 1st Division to Premier League

1996	Runner Up Silver Medal with 3 SC Shooting Stars of Nigeria in the

African Club Championship.  CAF Championship

(Formerly Sekou Toure Cup)

1996	Won OYO State Challenge Cup with 3 SC Shooting Stars of Ibandan

Nigeria

1993	Led Nitel Vasco Dagama from 1st Division to Premier League, Nigeria

1992	Won the Lagos State Amateur League with French Embassy FC, Nigeria

1991	Won the Northern Zone Championship with Kolentern Rover F.C.,

Sierra Leone

References

External links 
 https://web.archive.org/web/20160817235931/http://old.liberiansoccer.com/
 http://www.goal.com/en/news/.../liberian-fa-shortlists-five-coaches-for-national-team-job
 http://www.allafrica.com/stories/200209300718.html

1957 births
Living people
People from Grand Kru County
Liberian football managers